Pseudomelatoma sticta is a species of small sea snail, a marine gastropod mollusk in the family Pseudomelatomidae.

Distribution
This marine species occurs off California, USA.

References

 Berry, S. Stillman. "Mollusca dredged by the Orca off the Santa Barbara Islands, California, in 1951." Journal of the Washington Academy of Sciences 46.5 (1956): 150-157.
 Turgeon, D.; Quinn, J.F.; Bogan, A.E.; Coan, E.V.; Hochberg, F.G.; Lyons, W.G.; Mikkelsen, P.M.; Neves, R.J.; Roper, C.F.E.; Rosenberg, G.; Roth, B.; Scheltema, A.; Thompson, F.G.; Vecchione, M.; Williams, J.D. (1998). Common and scientific names of aquatic invertebrates from the United States and Canada: mollusks. 2nd ed. American Fisheries Society Special Publication, 26. American Fisheries Society: Bethesda, MD (USA). . IX, 526 + cd-rom pp. (look up in IMIS)
page(s): 103

External links
 

sticta
Gastropods described in 1956